Batavia Township is one of the fourteen townships of Clermont County, Ohio, United States. As of the 2010 census the township population was 23,280, up from 17,503 in 2000.

Geography
Located in the center of the county, it borders the following townships:
Stonelick Township - north
Jackson Township - northeast
Williamsburg Township - east
Tate Township - southeast
Monroe Township - south
Pierce Township - southwest
Union Township - northwest

The incorporated village and county seat of  Batavia is located in the center of the Township. Parts of the former village of Amelia (dissolved in 2019) are located in the southwest.

Name and history
Batavia Township was organized in 1815. It is the only Batavia Township statewide.

Economy
American Modern Insurance Group, Inc. is based in the township.

Government
The township is governed by a three-member board of trustees, who are elected in November of odd-numbered years to a four-year term beginning on the following January 1. Two are elected in the year after the presidential election and one is elected in the year before it. There is also an elected township fiscal officer, who serves a four-year term beginning on April 1 of the year after the election, which is held in November of the year before the presidential election. Vacancies in the fiscal officership or on the board of trustees are filled by the remaining trustees.

References

External links
Township website
County website

Townships in Clermont County, Ohio
Townships in Ohio